Vaasanthi (born as Pankajam on 26 July 1941) is an Indian journalist and writer. 

She got her degree in English literature and history at Mysore University and a Master's degree at Oslo University in Norway. She served as the editor of India Today, Tamil edition for nine years. Many of her essays on art, culture, and politics have been seriously focused on the emergence of a number of articles and created debates.

Vaasanthi has written a number of lectures and reports on women's issues and she is also a political analyst. Penguin Books published a book in English (Cut-outs, Caste and Cines Stars) with their standings in the political history of Tamil Nadu during the time she worked as the editor of India Today.

She also wrote the biography of J. Jayalalithaa in 2016. She has written around 40 novels and six short story collections.

Vaasanthi wrote a biography of M. Karunanidhi titled Karunanidhi: The Definitive Biography.

She appeared on the podcast, The Literary City with Ramjee Chandran to talk about her latest book, Breaking Free.

Books

Tamil

Aakasa Veedugal
Aarthikku Mugam Sivanthathu
Aasai Mugam Maranthu Pochey!
Agni Kunju
Ammani
America Payana Diary
Aval Sonnathu
Deivangal Ezhuga
Ellai Kodu
Ellaigalin Vilimbil
Ettatha Kilaigal
Idaiveligal Thodarkindrana
India Enum Aithegam
Indre Nesiyungal
Iravukkum Pagalukkum Idaiye...
Jaipur Necklace
Jananam
Jeyalalitaa Manamum Maayaiyum
Kaadhalenum Vaanavil
Kaalam
Kaalamellam Kaathirunthu...
Kaaranamilla Kaariyangal
Kadai Bommaigal
Kadaisi Varai
Kalaignar Ennum Karunanidhi
Kannukku Theriyatha Ulagangal
Karai Seratha Odangal
Kariya Megangalil Oli Keetrugal
Kathai Kathaiyaam Karanamaam
Kathavillatha Veedu
Kizhakkey Oru Ulagam
Kuttravaali
Maaligai Paravaigal
Maara Vendiya Paathaigal
Manithargal Paathi Neram Thoongukirargal
Meendum Naalai Varum
Meetchi
Moongil Pookkal
Mouna Puyal
Mounathin Kural
Munneru!
Muthukkal Pathu
Naan Budhanillai
Nagarangal Manithargal Panpaadugal
Nalliravu Suriyargal
Nazhuvum Nerangal
Nijangal Nizhalahumpothu...
Nijangal
Ninaivil Pathintha Chuvadukal
Nirkka Nizhal Vendum
Nizhal Tharum Tharuve
Nizhalattam
Nizhalgal
Oru Sangamathai Thedi...
Paarvaigalum Pathivugalum
Paathipugal
Paravaigal Parakkindrana
Pathaiyorathu Pookkal
Petrathum Izhanthathum
Plum Marangal Poothuvittana
Poi Mugam
Poiyil Pootha Nijam
Puriyatha Arthangal
Puthiya Vaanam
S.V.V. Enum Rasavaadhi
Sandhiya
Sariyaa? Sariyaa?
Santhanakaadugal
Shurthi Bethangal
Sindhikka Oru Nodi
Siragukal
Sirai!
Sontham Illatha Bandham
Thaagam
Tharaiyellam Shenbaga Poo
Theekul Viralai Vaithal
Thirakkatha Jannalgal
Thunaivi
Thurathum Ninaivugal Azhaikkum Kanavugal
Ula Vara Oru Ulagam
Vaakkumoolam
Vadikaal
Valliname Melliname
Vasantham Kasanthathu!
Veedu Varai Uravu
Veli
Vendatha Varam
Ver Pidikkum Mann
Vergalai Thedi...
Vidiyalai Nokki...
Vittu Viduthalaiyagi...
Yathumagi...
Yuga Sandhi
Yugangal Marumpothu

English

Amma: Jayalalithaa's Journey from Movie Star to Political Queen (2016)
At the Cusp of Ages (2008)
Cut-outs, Caste and Cines Stars (2008)
Karunanidhi: The Definitive Biography (2020)
The Lone Empress: A Portrait of Jayalalithaa (2020)
Rajnikanth: A Life (2021)

References

Tamil-language writers
Indian women novelists
Novelists from Tamil Nadu
21st-century Indian novelists
Living people
21st-century Indian women writers
21st-century Indian writers
Women writers from Tamil Nadu
20th-century Indian women writers
20th-century Indian novelists
1941 births